Crash Bandicoot 2: N-Tranced is a 2003 platform game developed by Vicarious Visions and published by Universal Interactive for the Game Boy Advance. It is the eight installment in the Crash Bandicoot video game series and the sequel to Crash Bandicoot: The Huge Adventure (2002). The game was released in North America on January 7 and in Europe on March 14, 2003, respectively.

N-Tranced is the eighth installment in the Crash Bandicoot video game series and the second Crash Bandicoot game to be released on a handheld console. The game's story centers on the exploits of the main character, Crash Bandicoot, as he sets out to save his sister Coco and friend Crunch from Doctor N. Tropy, who has brainwashed them with the help of his ally N. Trance to conquer all of time and space. A sequel, Crash Bandicoot Purple: Ripto's Rampage, was released in 2004.

Gameplay

N-Tranced is a platform game in which the player controls Crash Bandicoot, who must free his friends from the hypnosis of the main antagonists of the story. Much of the game takes place in a dimensional bubble that Crash and his mentor Aku Aku are trapped in. The inside of the bubble is displayed as a map littered with portals to different levels. Connecting the portals are dotted lines which Crash can use to travel between portals; initially, only a few dotted lines are visible. The goal of each level is to find and obtain any Crystals and Gems hidden in the area. As more Crystals are retrieved from the levels, more dotted lines will become visible on the map, allowing for further exploration. Gems allow access to special levels necessary for full completion of the game. When the antagonists of the game have been defeated and enough Crystals have been gathered to return to Earth, the game is won.

"Relics" can be won by re-entering a level where the Crystal has already been retrieved. To obtain a Relic, the player must initiate the "Time Trial" mode and race through a level in the pre-designated time displayed before entering a level. To begin a Time Trial run, the player must enter a level and activate the floating stopwatch near the beginning of the level to activate the timer; if the stopwatch is not touched, the level can be played regularly. The player must then race through the level as quickly as possible. Scattered throughout the level are yellow crates with the numbers 1, 2 or 3 on them. When these crates are broken, the timer is frozen for the number of seconds designated by the box. Sapphire, Gold and Platinum Relics can be won depending on how low the player's final time is.

At the beginning of the game, Crash has the ability to jump to navigate ledges, spin in a tornado-like fashion to break open crates and defeat enemies, deliver a body slam to break open tough objects and can either slide across the ground or crouch and crawl to get past low areas. Crash can expand on these abilities by defeating boss characters, often resulting in more powerful attacks or increased jumping and running prowess. Crash starts the game with six lives. Crash loses a life when he is struck by an enemy attack or suffers any other type of damage. More lives can be earned by instructing Crash to collect 100 "Wumpa Fruits" or break open a special crate to collect a life. Crash can be shielded from enemy attacks by collecting an Aku Aku mask. Collecting three of these masks allows temporary invulnerability from all minor dangers.

Plot

Characters

Seven returning characters from previous Crash titles star in N-Tranced. The protagonist of the game, Crash Bandicoot, is a bandicoot who must rescue his friends from the hypnosis of the main antagonist Doctor Nefarious Tropy and his ally N. Trance. Aiding Crash is Aku Aku, an ancient wooden mask who can temporarily protect Crash from harm. Crash's friends, who have been captured and hypnotized by the main antagonists, consist of Coco Bandicoot, Crash's spirited genius sister and Crunch Bandicoot, a "super-bandicoot" who joined Crash's family after the events of Crash Bandicoot: The Wrath of Cortex. The main antagonist of the story, Doctor Nefarious Tropy, is the self-proclaimed master of time who teams up with Aku Aku's evil twin brother Uka Uka. A new character in the series is N. Trance, an egg-like being from the Fifth Dimension who uses his mastery of hypnotism to command Crash's friends. Also aiding the villains is Fake Crash, an deformed alter ego duplicate of Crash.

Story
After the failure of Doctor Neo Cortex's previous scheme to shrink the Earth, Uka Uka entrusts Doctor Nefarious Tropy with the task of aiding him in universal domination. Tropy peers into the future and sees himself standing amongst the Bandicoots and concludes that since the Bandicoots keep thwarting them, their only solution is to bring them to their side. With this, he recruits N. Trance, master of hypnotism. Meanwhile, back on N. Sanity Island, Crash Bandicoot sleeps away while his friends Crunch and sister Coco are abducted by a strange vortex. Aku Aku alerts Crash of the situation and tells him to bring him a Power Crystal so that he can see into what's going on. But when he does, Crash begins to be sucked in by the vortex. While Aku Aku tries to rescue Crash, he uses the Power Crystal's power to discover that N. Tropy is behind this. With the last of his power, he rescues Crash. N. Tropy ends up abducting Crash's alter ego clone named Fake Crash, but he doesn't seem to notice and has N. Trance successfully hypnotise the Bandicoots into doing his every whim.

Meanwhile, somewhere else in hyperspace, Crash and Aku Aku plan to collect more Power Crystals so that Aku Aku can open more areas of hyperspace, free Coco and Crunch, and foil N. Tropy's plan. Crash frees Crunch after a battle in the skies of Baghdad and Coco is freed after a battle inside a volcano. After Crash defeats Fake Crash inside an Egyptian tomb, N. Tropy and N. Trance realize that they've captured the wrong Crash, but assure themselves that the Bandicoots will never find their hideout. However, with a few more Power Crystals, Crash and Aku Aku enter the hideout. When Crash and Fake Crash defeat N. Trance, N. Tropy flees into one last vortex. Crash defeats N. Tropy after a long and tough battle. With N. Tropy's defeat and capture, Aku Aku decides they should take a picture to celebrate. The Bandicoots group around N. Tropy as Fake Crash takes a picture. This turns out to be the future N. Tropy saw. Meanwhile, Uka Uka, upset over N. Tropy's defeat, promises a real adversary in the future.

Development

The audio for N-Tranced was composed by Manfred Linzer of Shin'en Multimedia.

Reception

N-Tranced received generally positive reviews from critics. IGN said that "the sequel's biggest unique element is its pretty darn fun Altasphere challenges, inspired by the PS2/GameCube/Xbox "Wrath of Cortex" levels and powered by Vicarious Visions' "Tony Hawk" GBA engine." Eduardo Zacarias of GameZone criticized the low difficulty of the game, while Fennec Fox of GamePro concluded that "the mini-game stages can be disappointing (the hamster ball sections have completely unrealistic physics), but overall Crash is not a bad little platformer at all. Unoriginal but not bad." Play Magazine remarked that "this Bandicoot's got plenty of gas left in his belly. Sometimes it smells, other times, it's fresh as a daisy," while Nintendo Power noted that "the single-player game covers more than 30 levels with new nonlinear level progression." Avi Fryman of GameSpy called the game "an amusing romp through the bizarre Crash Bandicoot universe. It's not the best game of its kind, but it's certainly worth a visit," while Game Informer decided that "Crash's latest romp is fun, but does not reinvent the wheel." Frank Provo of GameSpot called the game "a solid effort all around," while Scott Alan Marriott of AllGame ("All Game Guide" at the time) concluded that "N-Tranced will not hypnotize players with its ambitious design or extensive new features, but the quality of presentation and fast-paced arcade-style action make it easy to recommend." Mark MacDonald of Electronic Gaming Monthly, commending the game for being faithful to the Crash formula and criticizing the 3D stages featuring Coco flying through space as "sloppy" and "annoying", promised that "younger gamers won't be disappointed." Kristan Reed of Eurogamer deduced that "given its high price tag and scant innovation Crash Bandicoot 2: N-Tranced is unlikely to win over any new converts by playing it so safe and so young."

References

External links
 

2003 video games
Crash Bandicoot games
Game Boy Advance games
Game Boy Advance-only games
Video games developed in the United States
Video games set in Oceania
Video games set in Saudi Arabia
Video games set in Egypt
Video games set in Australia
Category:Video games set on fictional islands
Video game sequels
Konami games
Universal Interactive games
Vicarious Visions games
Platform games
Multiplayer and single-player video games
Fiction about hypnosis